Riccardo De Magistris (born 2 June 1954) is an Italian former water polo player who competed in the 1976 Summer Olympics, winning the silver medal with his squad. He is the younger brother of Gianni De Magistris, a teammate at those games who also took part in four other Olympics.

See also
 List of Olympic medalists in water polo (men)

References

External links
 

1954 births
Living people
Italian male water polo players
Water polo players at the 1976 Summer Olympics
Olympic silver medalists for Italy in water polo
Medalists at the 1976 Summer Olympics
Sportspeople from Florence